Winchester is a ghost town in Worthington Township, Richland County, Ohio, United States, along the Clear Fork River.  It was established south of Newville.

History
In March 1845, the town of Winchester was laid out in Section 9, on the Clear Fork River by Noble Calhoun. A few houses were erected, but the land upon which it was platted was heavily mortgaged and was later sold at a Sheriff's sale. The town never amounted to more than a few homes.

References

External links
Worthington Township page with Winchester

Geography of Richland County, Ohio
Ghost towns in Ohio